Gerardo Ulloa Pérez (born 29 October 1965) is a Mexican politician affiliated with the Party of the Democratic Revolution. As of 2014 he served as Deputy of the LIX Legislature of the Mexican Congress representing the State of Mexico.

References

1965 births
Living people
Politicians from Chiapas
Party of the Democratic Revolution politicians
21st-century Mexican politicians
People from Jiquipilas
Deputies of the LIX Legislature of Mexico
Members of the Chamber of Deputies (Mexico) for the State of Mexico